Miles Taylor may refer to:

 Miles Taylor (politician) (1805–1873), Louisianan member of the U.S. House of Representatives
 Miles Taylor (historian) (born 1961), British historian
 Miles Taylor (security expert) (active 2017 and later), former U.S. government official known for his once-anonymous criticisms of Donald Trump
 Miles Taylor (rower), competitor for Ireland in the 2019 World Rowing Championships